What a Way to Live is the fifth studio album by American country music artist Mark Chesnutt. His first album for Decca Records, it earned RIAA gold certification in the United States for sales of 500,000 copies. The tracks "She Dreams", "Goin' Through the Big D", "Gonna Get a Life", and "Down in Tennessee" were all released as singles, peaking at #6, #2, #1, and #23, respectively, on the Billboard Hot Country Songs charts. "She Dreams" was co-written and originally recorded by Tim Mensy on his 1992 album This Ol' Heart, from which it was released as a single, peaking at #74 on the country charts that year. Mark duets with Waylon Jennings on the track "Rainy Day Woman" which Jennings first recorded on his 1974 album The Ramblin' Man. The title track was originally recorded by Willie Nelson in 1960.

Track listing

Personnel
 Brent Rowan - electric guitar
 Tim Broussard - squeezebox
 Mark Chesnutt - lead vocals 
 Glen Duncan - fiddle, mandolin
 Pat Flynn - acoustic guitar
 Paul Franklin - steel guitar
 Owen Hale - drums
 Rob Hajacos - fiddle
 Roy Huskey Jr. - upright bass
 Paul Leim - drums
 B. James Lowry - acoustic guitar
 Tim Mensy - acoustic guitar
 Steve Nathan - keyboards
 Russ Pahl - steel guitar
 Matt Rollings - keyboards
 Biff Watson - acoustic guitar
 Bob Wray - bass guitar
Background Vocals: Curtis "Mr. Harmony" Young, John Wesley Ryles, Bergen White, Jana King, Lisa Silver, Dennis Wilson, Cindy Walker, Tom Flora, Chris Harris, Matt Kaminski, Ann Wright, Kim Rogers.
Strings by the Nashville String Machine, conducted by Carl Gorodetzky and arranged by Bergen White.

Production
Recording Engineers
Warren Peterson
Robert Charles
King Williams
Larry Jeffries
Mixers
Lynn Peterzell
Mark Hagen
Mark Friego
Master Editor
Glenn Meadows
Production Coordinator
Joe Johnston
Art Direction/Design
Simon Levy
Photography
Keith Carter
Hair & Make-up
Lucy Santamassino

Charts

Weekly charts

Year-end charts

Certifications

References

1994 albums
Mark Chesnutt albums
Decca Records albums
Albums produced by Mark Wright (record producer)